This is a list of short fiction by Stephen King (b. 1947). This includes short stories, novelettes, and novellas, as well as poems. It is arranged chronologically by first publication. Major revisions of previously published pieces are also noted. Stephen King is sometimes credited with "nearly 400 short stories" (or a similarly large number). However, all the known published pieces of short fiction are tabulated below. In all, 209 works are listed. Most of these pieces have been collected in King's six short story collections: Night Shift (1978), Skeleton Crew (1985), Nightmares & Dreamscapes (1993), Everything's Eventual (2002), Just After Sunset (2008), and The Bazaar of Bad Dreams (2015); and in King's five novella collections: Different Seasons (1982), Four Past Midnight (1990), Hearts in Atlantis (1999), Full Dark, No Stars (2010), and If It Bleeds (2020). Also the compilation Secret Windows: Essays and Fiction on the Craft of Writing Some of these pieces, however, remain uncollected.

1950s

1959

1960s

1960

1963

1964

1965

1966

1967

1968

1969

1970s

1970

1971

1972

1973

1974

1975

1976

1977

1978

1979

1980s

1980

1981

1982

1983

1984

1985

1986

1987

1988

1989

1990s

1990

1992

1993

1994

1995

1997

1998

1999

2000s

2000

2001

2003

2004

2005

2006

2007

2008

2009

2010s

2010

2011

2012

2013

2014

2015

2016

2017

2018

2019

2020s

2020

2021

2022

See also 

 Stephen King bibliography
 Unpublished and uncollected works by Stephen King

References
 Wood, Rocky (November 9, 2004). The Complete Guide to the Works of Stephen King
 Wood, Rocky (September 4, 2012). Stephen King: Uncollected, Unpublished, Overlook Connection Press. ( and )
 Brooks, Justin; Wood, Rocky (April 6, 2013). Stephen King: A Primary Bibliography of the World’s Most Popular Author, Overlook Connection Press..

External links

Bibliographies by writer

Horror fiction bibliographies